Kahlik Bolaghi (also Romanized as Kahlīk Bolāghī; also known as Kahlak Bolāghī, Kahlek Boolaghi, Kahlek Bouāghī, Kailikh Bulāgh, and Kiilikhbulag) is a village in Mavazekhan-e Sharqi Rural District, Khvajeh District, Heris County, East Azerbaijan Province, Iran. At the 2006 census, its population was 35, in 7 families.

References 

Populated places in Heris County